Raging Planet is an American documentary television series that originally aired in 1997 and 2009 on the Discovery Channel. The program focuses on natural disasters. It currently airs periodically on the Science Channel.

Summary
The show, Raging Planet, focuses on natural disasters that happen on Earth, including tornadoes, hurricanes, avalanches, lightning, fires, volcanoes, earthquakes, and blizzards. It features actual videos taken during disasters, CGI effects, and a few reenactments. The show often had the science behind how these disasters occurred (how lightning forms, how a tornado is born, etc.) as well as case studies of certain disasters. The program often uses scale models rather than CGIs. Rescue workers, scientists, and survivors are interviewed. Actual footage of rescue workers and scientists predicting and researching the featured disaster is used. Season 2 was produced in 2008–2009 on HD format from locations around the world. Transmitted in the United States, the United Kingdom, and internationally in 2009 on the Discovery Channel, the series was directed by Mark Westcott, Alex Williamson, Susannah Ward, and Martin Gorst, and was produced by Pioneer TV.

Episodes

Season 1 (1997)
The first season was produced in 1997 and it has ten episodes.

Season 2 (2009)
The second season was produced in 2009 on HD format and it has eight episodes.

References

External links
Video clips at Discovery.com

Discovery Channel original programming
Science Channel original programming
1997 American television series debuts
2009 American television series endings
1990s American documentary television series
2000s American reality television series